is a gay video production company in Japan. Founded in 1993, its headquarters are in Shimokitazawa, Setagaya, Tokyo.

History

Coat Corporation launched Power Grip, which featured mainly gym class students, in 1991. Since then, the company has regularly released works of about eight titles each month, and has contributed more than 160 titles to date all the while changing the genre. Affiliated yūgen gaisha  has been around since 1997 while Coat West in Osaka Prefecture has been releasing works under the same name since 2003.

After Power Grip, the company launched many new labels, under which they produced more than forty titles. Their wide range of models and themes such as athletes, Johnny's, salarymen, gay slangs, and SM, fit in genres ranging from soft to hard.

Around the same time, Coat released its first situational gay video series Babylon, reaching Vol. 60 in 2012. Kuratatsu later released the heavy gym-class label, and the Johnny's Jr. label, Fine, from Out Staff in 1997. Although  was discontinued in 2008 after Volume 25, Fine still continues to release work, with its total number of titles reaching over sixty, as of 2012. A variety of other labels were also established. One called Exfeed became independent afterwards.

Criminal case
In 1996, a male high school student was told to "not appear in the video" on the streets of Setagaya, but he agreed that he "would take off his pants for ¥2,000" or "¥50,000 for thirty minutes" and was filmed naked in a nearby karaoke box, and led to seven people, including Corporation President Hayato Eroshima, getting arrested for violation of the Employment Security Law (recruitment for harassment work purposes). This case was related to that of Tokyo Metropolitan High School teacher Yumiko Kato's involvement in "Imakita Kato" which consisted of television tarento, and it was widely reported that there were 170 students who appeared in response to the solicitation.

Internet meme

A Midsummer Night's Wet Dream (Hepburn: Manatsu no Yoru no Inmu), a porn produced by Coat Corporation, gained public attention in 2002 after professional baseball player Kazuhito Tadano was found to be in the cast. Soon after the founding of Japanese video-sharing website Niconico in 2007, Internet users began to upload video mash-up parodies mocking this scandal. Inmu videos and its creator communities have been in steady growth since 2010 and Inmu remains the post popular genre of videos on Niconico today. Now Inmu represents a collection of Internet contents ridiculing Japanese gay pornography. Many other porns made by Coat Corporation or other companies are also included. Inmu communities typically make fun of the lines and plots of these porns. While popular among youths on social media, Inmu generally remains a taboo in traditional media due to its connection to pornography and a past scandal.

The central figure of Inmu videos is Yaju Senpai, an actor appearing in the original porn, who is parodied the most. His true name is never revealed and an attempt to identify him in 2016 was cancelled due to moral concerns.

List of brands
These include former labels.

Coat
Active Body
Another Version (both male and female subjects)
Babylon (story-type) its most notable work is Manatsu no Yo no Inmu
birth
Coat
DMT (athlete-type)
Fella Zammai
Gand
Hello
King Cock
Number (athlete-type)
Power Grip
Rock Bull
Round Zero (athlete-type)
Precious (solo works)
Shoot
Taiiku-kai Seiha

 Former labels
Hentai Mensetsu-kan Super S (job interviews)
Misshitsu to Hito
Nanpa Senmon Gakugun
Out Staff (athlete-type/re-edited version also released in 2013)
Scooop!!!
Scout Caravan (scout-type)

Kuratatsu
Basara (SM-type)
CK Head Line (catalogue)
Complete Couple (best collection collecting the titles of two actors)
Complete File (best collection collecting the titles of an actor)
Conception
 (Yarō-type/first issue released in 1997)
Discovery
EnVY (story-type)
E-Style
Fine (idol-type/first issue released in 1997)
The Feti (scatology-type, gaten-type, etc.)
Gacchibi!! (featuring short actors)
Ge:X
Harem
i-mode Gakuen (idol-type) ※ ended
Kuratatsu
Nude (idol-type)
Scooop!!! (hard-type) (サイクロップス先輩 introduction)
Scratch (documentary-type)
Sei Kore. (gaku ran-type)
Taikyoku (gachimuchi-type)

Coat West (Osaka)
Ace
Back Sniper
Coat West
The Series "The Deisui"
ELoS (Edge Life of Story) (story-type)
Grand Slam
Hostclub Hot News * Idol Beach (Big Wave, Endless Journey etc.)
Kiss
The Series "The Kōshō"
Luxe (Sho, Hikaru, Nagi)
Maniac (stealthy camera-type)
MVP (athlete-type)
Only Shining Star (solo projects)
Otoko (gachimuchi-type)
Re:D (hard-type)
Shasei Triathlon
smart (idol-type)
Sta Tan
Straight Style (both male and female subjects)
S.W.A.P
Versus
West Gate
Wild Biz (salaryman-type)
Winner (athlete-type)

Others
Exfeed

References

External links
 Official website 
 Male gay video distribution site powered by Coat Corporation

See also

Billy Herrington – his starring works became popular as "Homoneta"

Japanese pornographic film studios
Gay pornographic film studios
Companies based in Tokyo
Mass media companies established in 1991
Publishing companies established in 1991
Japanese companies established in 1991